The  1964 Kansas City Chiefs season was the fifth season for the Kansas City Chiefs as a professional AFL franchise and second season in Kansas City following their move from Dallas. The Chiefs began the year with a 2–1 mark, then dropped three consecutive games as several of the team's best players, including E.J. Holub, Fred Arbanas, and Johnny Robinson, missed numerous games with injuries. Arbanas missed the final two games of the year after undergoing surgery to his left eye, in which he suffered almost total loss of vision. Running back Mack Lee Hill, who signed with the club as a rookie free agent and received a mere $300 signing bonus, muscled his way into the starting lineup and earned a spot in the AFL All-Star Game.

The club ended the season with a pair of wins to finish at 7–7, runner-up in the AFL Western Division, 1½ games behind the San Diego Chargers. An average attendance of just 18,126 for the seven home games at Municipal Stadium prompted discussion at the AFL owners' meeting about the Chiefs future in Kansas City. Quarterback Lenny Dawson proceeded to have the best season of his career completing 199 passes out of 354 attemps for 2,879 yards and 30 touchdowns with	18 interceptions for a passer rating of 56.2 and a completion percentage of 89.9

Schedule

Standings

References 

Kansas City Chiefs seasons
Kansas City Chiefs
Kansas